George Edwin Bowden (July 6, 1852 – January 22, 1908) was a U.S. Representative from Virginia, nephew of Lemuel Jackson Bowden.

Biography
Born in Williamsburg, Virginia, Bowden attended a private school.
He studied law.
He was admitted to the bar but never practiced.
He engaged in banking.
He served as collector of customs for the port of Norfolk from September 1879 until May 1885.

Bowden was elected as a Republican to the Fiftieth and Fifty-first Congresses (March 4, 1887 – March 3, 1891).
He was an unsuccessful candidate for reelection in 1890 to the Fifty-second Congress.
He served as again collector of customs for the port of Norfolk.
He served as clerk of the United States Court for the Eastern District of Virginia from March 10, 1899, until his death in Norfolk, Virginia, January 22, 1908.
He was interred in Elmwood Cemetery.

Elections

1886; Bowden was elected to the U.S. House of Representatives defeating Democrat Marshall Parks, winning 60.72% of the vote.
1888; Bowden was re-elected defeating Democrat Richard C. Marshall and Independent Republican Andrew Williams, winning 58.69% of the vote.
1890; Bowden lost his re-election bid to Democrat John William Lawson.

Sources

1852 births
1908 deaths
Republican Party members of the United States House of Representatives from Virginia
Politicians from Williamsburg, Virginia
19th-century American politicians